Biratnagar City FC is a Nepali professional franchise football club based at Biratnagar. Biratnagar city club competes in the Nepal Super League, the top flight football league in Nepal.

History
The club was formed in March 2021 after the establishment of Nepal Super League, the first ever franchise football league in Nepal, under the supervision of All Nepal Football Association (ANFA). The club played their first match on 25 April 2021 against Dhangadhi.However even with a promising start they failed to keep consistent and they came 6th failing to reach the second part of the tournament

2021 squad

2022 squad

Technical staff

Head coaching record

Sponsors

References

2020–21 in Nepalese football
Association football clubs established in 2021
2021 establishments in Nepal
Nepal Super League
Football clubs in Nepal